Enrique Álvarez Félix (5 April 1934 – 24 May 1996) was a Mexican actor, known for his roles in telenovelas and in films, such as The Monastery of the Vultures and The House of the Pelican.

Family and personal life
Enrique Álvarez Félix was the son of Mexican actress María Félix and her first husband, Enrique Álvarez Alatorre. When his parents divorced in 1938, his mother lived for a time at home with her own parents until 1939, when she traveled with Enrique to Mexico City. Soon after, her ex-husband took Álvarez Félix. 

When his mother married Jorge Negrete he became the stepbrother of Diana Negrete. 

Álvarez Félix never married, and, according to Mexican novelist and essayist Carlos Fuentes, he was  sexually frustrated, and had an Oedipus complex.

Death
Enrique Álvarez Félix died from a heart attack in the early morning of Friday, May 24, 1996, aged 62.

Telenovelas
A telenovela is a type of long miniseries which tells one self-contained story, typically within the span of a year or less. However, they are usually much longer than the typical miniseries; ranging from 60 to 200 episodes. 

  The Golden Woman  (1960)
  House of neighborhood  (1964)
  Valeria  (1965)
  Soul of my soul  (1965)
  Wild Heart  (1966) 
  Between shadows  (1967)
  Scam of love  (1968)
  The portrait of de Dorian Gray  (1969)
  I know never  (1970)
  The constitution  (1971-1972)
  The twins  (1972)
  The carriage  (1972)
  The building opposite  (1972)
  My rival  (1973)
  Doll  (1974)
  The spring of the miracle  (1974)
  The unforgivable  (1975-1976)
  Rina  (1977) 
  The Sin of love  (1978-1979)
  Colorina  (1980-1981)
  What the sky does not forgive  (1982)
  You are my destiny  (1984)
  Thoroughbred  (1985-1986)
  Light and shadow  (1989)
  The Devil's smile  (1992)
  Marisol  (1996)

Álvarez's last acting role was "Leonardo" in Marisol (1996). The title character, Leonardo's niece, was played by Erika Buenfil; Leonardo's wife, Ámparo, was played by Claudia Islas. He died two days after the episode in which his character, Leonardo, was killed off.

Films
  The Immortal Charro  (1955)
  Simon of the Desert  (1964)
  The Crows are in Mourning  (1965)
  The Two Elenas  (1965)
  House of Women  (1966)
  Requiem for a scoundrel (1966)
  The riders of the witch  (1966)
  The Outsiders (Los Caifanes)  (1966)
  The Green Years  (1966)
  Three nights of madness  (1968)
  Chronicle of a coward  (1968)
  Trap for a cadaver  (1969)
  Narda or summer  (1970)
  The Angels of the Afternoon  (1970)
  The spring of the scorpions  (1971)
  Victoria  (1972)
  The disturbed  (1972)
  The Monastery of the Vultures  (1973)
  Love does not have a woman's face  (1973)
  Labyrinth of passions  (1975)
  The House of the Pelican '' (1978)

Family tree

See also
Enrique Álvarez Félix filmography
María Félix filmography
Enrique's stepfathers:Agustín LaraJorge Negrete
María Teresa Lara, step-aunt of Enrique

References

External links 

 
 Enrique Álvarez Félix profile with dates of birth and death, Find a Grave
 

1934 births
1996 deaths
Male actors from Guadalajara, Jalisco
Mexican male telenovela actors
Mexican male television actors
Mexican male film actors
20th-century Mexican male actors
María Félix
Enrique